Micheldever Tyre Services Ltd, trading as Protyre are primarily focused on the fast fitting of motor vehicles, specialising in tyres, brakes, exhausts and batteries. They also cater for MOT testing & servicing and air conditioning. To date, they have accumulated 148 branches across the UK, the latest acquisitions are located in North West (2010) and Swansea (Wales), UK (2011). The Protyre brand spawned from Micheldever Tyre and Auto Services Limited and in 2006 was acquired by venture capitalists, Graphite Capital and Royal Bank of Scotland. It was sold to Sumitomo Rubber Industries in January 2017. Indeed reviews can be found here- https://uk.indeed.com/cmp/Protyre/reviews

History
Micheldever Tyre Services Ltd was founded in 1972 by Tony Todd starting in a farm building off the A303 before moving a mile or so to the site at Micheldever Station (two miles to the north of Micheldever, Hampshire) which is now the headquarters for the company. They now boast a work force of approximately 1000. Post buy out from Graphite and Royal Bank of Scotland, they have remained profitable and continue to expand. As well as retail, they run a wholesale division, which supplies in excess of 6 million tyres a year to its 2,500 plus wholesale customers. Previous owner Tony Todd, since selling the company in 2006, is ranked =782 in the Times Rich List, 2011.

Advertising
Their most recent slogans are, "More tread for your bread" and "The best service and price, guaranteed".

They now advertise online services for 'same day fitting' at their network of centres as well as the ability to book a timed appointment for MOT & Servicing online.

Ownership
Micheldever Tyre Services Ltd, trading as Protyre was founded by Tony Todd and run by him until 2006. when it was acquired] by Graphite and Royal Bank of Scotland.

In January 2017, Micheldever Tyre Services (MTS) was sold to Sumitomo Rubber Industries for £215 million.

References

External links
 Micheldever Tyre and Auto Services Limited
 Protyre, online tyre retailer

 

British companies established in 1972
Retail companies established in 1972
Companies based in Hampshire
Automotive repair shops